Mayuko Takata (高田万由子 Takata Mayuko, born January 5, 1971) is a Japanese actress, best known in the western world for her appearances on the Japanese TV show Iron Chef.

Personal life
She was born in Tokyo, Japan.  Her husband is Japanese violinist Taro Hakase. They currently reside  in Tokyo, Japan.

Iron Chef
Takata was a commentator and judge on the show.  She has no culinary training.

Education

April 1977 to 1990: Shirayuri Gakuen, a Catholic school for girls in Japan, with an emphasis on English language;
April 1987 (likely a component of study abroad program, at Gakuen): Institut Le Rosey in Switzerland (The Swiss Confederation), a very expensive boarding house in Switzerland in which Takata would have been in the company of princesses, heiresses, and the children of very powerful individuals;
April 1990 to March 1994: University of Tokyo - BA, focusing on Western History.

Language abilities

She is fluent in Japanese and English, and conversant in French.

Selected filmography

Movies
 (1993)
 (1994)
 (1994) (Voice)

TV dramas
 (1995, TBS)
Miss Cinderella (1997, Fuji TV)
 (2003, NTV)

Other television
 (1991, Fuji TV)
 (1994–1995, Fuji TV) - Judge and guest commentator
 (2001-2006, TBS) - Regular commentator
 (2005, Kansai TV/Fuji TV)
 (2005, MBS/TBS)
 (2005, MBS/TBS)
 (2005, MBS/TBS)

Media career

Radio
Yokohama City File (1993-1995)

Written Works
 (2000, 198 pages)
 (2000, 173 pages)
Takata was responsible for translating the Alistair, Le Crocodile Vert series of children's storybooks from French to Japanese.  The three original books were authored by Florence Grazia and illustrated by Isabelle Charly.
Alistair The Green Alligator (2004) - Original title: Alistair, Le Crocodile Vert
Alistair The Green Alligator: Lucie And The Smile Doctor (2004) - Original title: Le Pari d'Alistair
Alistair The Green Alligator: Lucie's Search For Treasure (2004) - Original title: La Croisière d'Alistair
 (2005, 111 pages)
 (2005, 143 pages)
Takata has also published or participated in the publication of many essays and magazine articles, including:
 (1993, published by Gakken)
 (1993, published by Kadokawa Shoten)
 (1994, published by Asahi Shimbun)
 (1995, published by Classy Magazine)
Ripple (1995, published by Keihin Electric Express Railway)
FYTTE (1996, published by Gakken) 
 (1997, published by Magazine House)
 (2001, published by Tokyo Shimbun)
Yomiuri Shimbun Evening Newspaper (contributes an article every month)
Fuji Bank Thanks... (contributes an article every month)
Shinano Mainichi Shimbun (contributes an article every month)
 (contributes an article every second month) 
 (published by NHK Publications) 
 (published by VISA)

Commercial Work
Minolta
JVC
Coca-Cola (1994, "Lecturer" campaign)
Rohto Pharmaceutical Co.
 (for "100% Carrot Juice") 
Chubu Electric Power 
 (for "Autumn"-flavoured potato chips) 
Taisho Pharmaceutical
Mitsui Fudosan ("1000 Cities - 1000 Towers" campaign)
 
Tokyu Group (for "Tokyu Plaza") 
Sumiyoshi-Yamate Commons (Higashinada-ku, Kōbe)
House Foods Corporation (for "Kokumaro"-brand tofu burger mix) 
 
Marriott International (for Okinawa Marriott Resort, Kariyushi Beach)

Stage Work
We Are The World (1993) at Theater Apple, Shinjuku, Tokyo
Tasoya Andon (1994) at Tokyo Takarazuka Theater, Chiyoda, Tokyo
Kokumaro Na Onna Tachi (2001), at Nagoya, Aichi and Bunkamura Theater Cocoon, Tokyo

Miscellaneous
Takata has been involved with the Pink Ribbon Smile Walk (for breast cancer awareness month)

Political Appointment

Takata was appointed as Goodwill Ambassador to the Nation of France in 2000.

External links
profile at Ken-on (her talent agency, in Japanese)

JMDb profile (in Japanese)

Japanese actresses
1971 births
Living people
People from Tokyo
Alumni of Institut Le Rosey
University of Tokyo alumni